Sione Masima (born 24 February 1993) is an Australian professional rugby league footballer who currently plays for the South Sydney Rabbitohs in the National Rugby League.

Background
Born in Camperdown, New South Wales, Masima played his junior football for the Gymea Gorillas, before being signed by the Cronulla-Sutherland Sharks.

Playing career

Early career
From 2011 to 2013, Masima played for the Cronulla-Sutherland Sharks' NYC team.

2014
In 2014, Masima moved on to the Sharks' New South Wales Cup team. In Round 24 of the 2014 NRL season, he made his NRL debut for the Sharks against the Canberra Raiders at Remondis Stadium, playing off the interchange bench in the Sharks' 22–12 loss. He went on to make a total of 3 appearances for the Sharks in 2014.

2015
In 2015, Masima joined the South Sydney Rabbitohs.

References

External links
2015 South Sydney Rabbitohs profile

1993 births
Australian rugby league players
Australian sportspeople of Tongan descent
Cronulla-Sutherland Sharks players
Rugby league second-rows
Rugby league locks
Living people
Rugby league players from Sydney